Vidyadhar S. Gokhale (Devanagari: विद्याधर गोखले) (4 January 1924 – 26 September 1996) was a political activist, a Marathi playwright, and an editor of a Marathi newspaper, Loksatta (लोकसत्ता), from Maharashtra, India.

Early life
Vidyadhar Gokhale was born in Amravati, Maharashtra. His father Sambhajirao Gokhale was a leader of the Indian National Congress and a Minister in the Central Provinces Government. Vidyadhar was influenced by the writings and thoughts of Veer Wamanrao Joshi.

He studied in Amravati and went to Mumbai in 1944. He was a post graduate in Marathi and Sanskrit. He taught in the General Education Society's School at Kurla.

Career

Literature
After teaching in Kurla, Gokhale became a journalist. Initially, he was the editor of a Marathi weekly. Between 1960 to 1983, he wrote about 60 plays and  66 songs for Sangeet Nataks. He is credited for the revival of the Sangeet Nataks. His plays consist of varied themes like historical, mythical and social issues. He also established an organisation called "Rangasharada" for the purpose of launching plays.

He wrote novel Jhanjhawat (झंझावात ). Some of his prominent plays are:
 Suvarna Tula (सुवर्णतुला) (1960)
 Panditraj Jagannath (पंडितराज जगन्नाथ) (1960)
 Mandarmala (मंदारमाला) (1963)
 Madanachi Manjiri (मदनाची मंजिरी) (1965)
 Jai Jai Gauri Shankar (जय जय गौरीशंकर) 
 Bawannkhani (बावनखणी) (१९८३)
  Swarsamradni (स्वरसम्राज्ञी’ (१९७३))

He presided over the Marathi Sahitya Sammelan in Satara in 1993.

Political career 

He had represented Mumbai North Central in 9th Lok Sabha in 1989–91 as Shiv Sena candidate. Throughout his life, he was affiliated with socio-political organizations like RSS, Hindu Mahasabha which are proponents of Hindutva ideology, and was associated with their leaders like Veer Savarkar, Pu Bha Bhave, Balasaheb Deoras.

Personal life 

He had married two sisters before polygamy was outlawed, and thus had two wives. His son Vijay Gokhale is an actor. Gokhale's grandson, Omkar Dadarkar, is a singer.

References

External links
 Official Biographical Sketch in Lok Sabha Website

Marathi-language writers
1924 births
1996 deaths
India MPs 1989–1991
Marathi politicians
Shiv Sena politicians
Lok Sabha members from Maharashtra
People from Amravati
20th-century Indian dramatists and playwrights
Dramatists and playwrights from Maharashtra
Politicians from Mumbai
Novelists from Maharashtra
Presidents of the Akhil Bharatiya Marathi Sahitya Sammelan